Joseanthus is a genus of South American flowering plants in the sunflower family.

 Species
 Joseanthus chimborazensis - Ecuador
 Joseanthus crassilanatus  - Ecuador
 Joseanthus cuatrecasasii - Ecuador
 Joseanthus sparrei - Ecuador
 Joseanthus trichotomus  - Colombia

References

 
Asteraceae genera
Taxonomy articles created by Polbot